The canton of Saint-Hilaire-du-Harcouët is an administrative division of the Manche department, northwestern France. Its borders were modified at the French canton reorganisation which came into effect in March 2015. Its seat is in Saint-Hilaire-du-Harcouët.

It consists of the following communes:

Buais-les-Monts 
Grandparigny
Hamelin
Lapenty
Les Loges-Marchis
Le Mesnillard
Montjoie-Saint-Martin
Moulines
Saint-Aubin-de-Terregatte
Saint-Brice-de-Landelles
Saint-Hilaire-du-Harcouët
Saint-James
Saint-Laurent-de-Terregatte
Saint-Senier-de-Beuvron
Savigny-le-Vieux

References

Cantons of Manche